Gertrud Amon Natzler (7 July 1908 – 3 June 1971) was an Austrian-American ceramicist, who together with her husband Otto Natzler created some of the most praised ceramics art of the 20th century, helping to elevate ceramics to the status of a fine art.

Early life 
Gertrud Amon was born on 7 July 1908 in Vienna, Austria, to a Jewish family. She was the daughter of Adolf Amon, who ran a stationery company, and Helene née Grünwald. She had one older brother, Hans.

After graduating from the Handelsakademie, Vienna's commercial school, she studied painting and drawing as well as working as a secretary. In 1933 met Otto Natzler, who had been laid off from a job as a textile designer, although their romance did not blossom until after he divorced his first wife in 1934.

Career 
Gertrud started to have an interest in pottery, and got Otto interested as well. After teaching themselves and studying at the ceramics studio of Franz Iskra, they opened their own studio and worked full-time as ceramicists. Otto and Gertrud soon became recognised for their art. Their first exhibition was in 1937, at the Galerie Würthle. On 11 March 1938, they learned that their works exhibited at the Exposition Internationale des Arts et Techniques dans la Vie Moderne had been awarded a silver medal. Later the same day, German troops marched into Austria, precipitating the annexation of Austria by Nazi Germany. They immediately began preparing to leave for the United States, with the help of Otto's cousin in Los Angeles. They married in June, and left Austria for Los Angeles in September.

The Natzlers started a new studio in Los Angeles, where she remained for the rest of her life. At first, they used a wheel and kiln brought from Vienna, and they made a living by offering individual instruction at their studio as well as selling their work. Recognition of the Natzlers' work in the United States began in 1939, when they won first prize at the Ceramic National. Their first full exhibition was in San Diego the following year, and it was followed by many more over the three decades thereafter. Between 1956 and 1960, the Natzlers were summer artists-in-residence at the Brandeis Institute.

For the most part, Gertrud worked as a potter and Otto as a glazer. Gertrud was remarkable from their Vienna days for throwing thin-walled vessels. From her early days in California, she was recognised for her skill at creating forms of "delicacy" by potters such as Harrison McIntosh. New York Times critic Lisa Hammel remarked in 1986 that her work was "always in equilibrium…Even the most violent glazes are held in a state of restraint by Gertrud's thin, gently curving shapes". Over her career, she threw more than 25,000 vessels.

Later life and legacy 
Gertrud Natzler died of cancer on 3 June 1971, leaving behind hundreds of unfinished pieces. Otto abandoned his work for over a year after her death, but as soon as he was able to, he began the process of firing and glazing them. These pieces continued to garner new and retrospective exhibitions. Among the prominent museums to hold retrospectives of the Natzlers' work were the Renwick Gallery in Washington, D.C. (1973), the Craft and Folk Art Museum in Los Angeles (1977), and the American Craft Museum in New York (1993). In 1994, two exhibitions of her work were held in Vienna, one at the Historical Museum of the City of Vienna, and one at the Jewish Museum Vienna. Their work is also held in the permanent collections of the Nelson-Atkins Museum of Art, the Seattle Art Museum, the University of Michigan Museum of Art, the Cooper Hewitt, and the Museum of Modern Art.

In 2001, Gertrud was posthumously awarded the Gold Medal for Consummate Craftsmanship of the American Craft Council together with her husband. Otto also eventually started a career as a solo artist, that lasted nearly until his death in 2007.

The Natzler's pieces Vase, 1965 and Bowl, 1968 were acquired by the Smithsonian American Art Museum as part of the Renwick Gallery's 50th Anniversary Campaign.

References 

1908 births
1971 deaths
Artists from Vienna
American ceramists
American people of Austrian-Jewish descent
Jewish American artists
Austrian ceramists
Austrian Jews
Deaths from cancer in the United States
Austrian women ceramists
American women ceramists
20th-century American women artists
20th-century ceramists
20th-century American Jews